Yolanda Williams (born 15 July 1943) is a Cuban gymnast. She competed in five events at the 1960 Summer Olympics.

References

External links
 

1943 births
Living people
Cuban female artistic gymnasts
Olympic gymnasts of Cuba
Gymnasts at the 1960 Summer Olympics
Sportspeople from Havana
Pan American Games medalists in gymnastics
Pan American Games bronze medalists for Cuba
Gymnasts at the 1963 Pan American Games
Gymnasts at the 1967 Pan American Games
Medalists at the 1963 Pan American Games
Medalists at the 1967 Pan American Games
20th-century Cuban women
21st-century Cuban women